The Arrondissement of Roeselare is one of the eight administrative arrondissements in the Province of West Flanders, Belgium.

The Administrative Arrondissement of Roeselare consists of the following municipalities:
Hooglede
Ingelmunster
Izegem
Ledegem
Lichtervelde
Moorslede
Roeselare
Staden

References

Roeselare